Diheterospora zeaspora (also known as Rotiferophthora zeaspora) is a rare species of fungus. It parasitizes animals known as rotifers.

References

External links
 Catalogue of Life 2011 Annual Checklist
 Diheterospora zeaspora at Mycobank

Hypocreales
Animal fungal diseases